Marie MacLeod was a Scottish aristocrat at the court of Mary, Queen of Scots.

Marie MacLeod was the daughter and heir of William MacLeod of Harris, and a granddaughter of Alasdair Crotach MacLeod. Her name was sometimes spelled "McCloyde" or "McCloid", or "Marie Clawde". She is regarded as a Chief of the Clan McLeod.

After her father died, in 1562 Queen Mary sent orders to Kenyeouth MacKenzie of Kintail that he should bring Marie MacLeod to her in Edinburgh. Another man, James McConeill, claimed her custody, but MacKenzie brought her to the queen. Marie joined the queen's household as a lady of her chamber.

On Christmas Eve 1562, Mary bought clothes for Marie MacLeod, including black velvet for a riding hood and veil, and silk chamlet for a petticoat, bodice, and sleeves. In February 1563 she was a given a length of plaiding and a farthingale. In March 1565 Mary ordered an outfit for Marie made of scarlet stemming for a cloak and a skirt front, known as a "devanter".

References

People from Harris, Outer Hebrides
Marie
Court of Mary, Queen of Scots
Marie